The Story: The Very Best of Spandau Ballet is a greatest hits album by English new wave band Spandau Ballet, released on 13 October 2014. The album includes three new songs that were produced by Trevor Horn.

Reception
Richard Folland from PopMatters wrote, "Like so many of their '80s generation peers, the band have reformed in recent years and a couple of new recordings produced by Trevor Horn have been tagged on to this new release. But this is essentially Spandau Ballet in their '80s pomp, not the first greatest hits album they've released, but a re-packaging to coincide with a tour next year and the release of a DVD entitled Playboys of the Western World, chronicling their rise and descent three decades ago."

Timothy Monger of AllMusic said, "The real draw here is the addition of three new songs recorded with legendary producer Trevor Horn" who in his opinion returned the band to its "classic, soulful" sound on these tracks.

Track listing

Personnel
 John Keeble – drums, percussion, backing vocals
 Gary Kemp – lead guitar, keyboards, synthesizers, piano, backing vocals
 Martin Kemp – bass guitar, guitar, backing vocals
 Steve Norman – saxophone, guitar, percussion, keyboards, backing vocals
 Tony Hadley – lead vocals, keyboards, synthesizers, percussion

Charts

Certifications

References

2014 greatest hits albums
Albums produced by Jolley & Swain
Albums produced by Trevor Horn
Rhino Records compilation albums
Spandau Ballet albums